Saint Francis Tulsa Tough Ride and Race is a three-day cycling festival in Tulsa, Oklahoma. It features non-competitive riding through scenic areas around the Tulsa Metropolitan Area and professional level races. It is held each year on Friday, Saturday and Sunday, the second weekend in June.

Saint Francis Tulsa Tough attracts professional and amateur racers from across the country racing criterium style races on three different venues in the streets of Downtown Tulsa and along the Arkansas River. Prize money rivals the largest purses in the nation.

In 2008, Tulsa Tough's women's pro races were selected by USA Cycling to be on the prestigious National Racing Calendar. Based on voting by racers, race officials, and announcers, Tulsa Tough was ranked in the top 10 out of 30 NRC races in only its third year. With this proven success, the men's and women's races were again on the National Racing Calendar for 2009 and after the event were ranked in the top four among all NRC events. 

Saint Francis Tulsa Tough offers two days of tour rides with 50 km, 100 km, 200 km, and 100 mi options each day covering nearly 400 miles of Northeast Oklahoma hills and scenery. All routes feature aid stations and rolling support for riders of all sizes and abilities.

Saint Francis Tulsa Tough is jointly promoted by the Tulsa Sports Commission and Tulsa Wheelmen and is supported by corporate sponsorship. Guidance for the event comes from an executive committee made up of several Tulsa-area cyclists and business people.

Cry Baby Hill, the last part of the grueling River Parks Criterium race, serves as the annual finale of the Tulsa Tough race. There, Tulsans line the hill to cheer them on, chug beers and parade around in costumes. Although the event began organically with the help of Team Soundpony, it has grown to become one of the largest parties and social events in the city.

References

External links
Official website

Sports in Tulsa, Oklahoma
Cycle races in the United States
Recurring sporting events established in 2006
2006 establishments in Oklahoma